George Stewart may refer to:

George Stewart, 9th Seigneur d'Aubigny (1618–1642), Scottish nobleman and Royalist commander in the English Civil War
George Stewart (surgeon) (1752–1813), president of the Royal College of Surgeons in Ireland
George Stewart, 8th Earl of Galloway (1768–1834), British naval commander and politician
George Stewart (VC) (1831–1868), Scottish recipient of the Victoria Cross
George Vesey Stewart (1832–1920), New Zealand farmer, coloniser and local politician
G. F. Stewart (George Francis Stewart, 1851–1928), Irish land agent
George H. Stewart (1858–1914), Associate Justice of the Idaho Supreme Court
George Neil Stewart (1860–1930), Scottish-Canadian doctor
George A. Stewart (1862–1894), head coach of the Harvard University football program
George Wilson Stewart (1862–1937), American architect
George E. Stewart (1872–1946), Philippine-American War Medal of Honor recipient
George Craig Stewart (1879–1940), bishop of the Episcopal Diocese of Chicago
George Stewart (New Zealand businessman) (1885–1955), New Zealand wool and fur skin exporter
J. George Stewart (1890–1970), American architect and politician
George R. Stewart (1895–1980), American professor and novelist
George F. Stewart (1908–1982), American food scientist
George Hepburn Stewart, New Zealand lieutenant-colonel, son of William Downie Stewart Sr
George Stewart, birth name of American race car driver Leon Duray
George Stewart (footballer, born 1873) (1873–1937), Australian rules footballer for St Kilda
George Stewart (1890s footballer), Scottish footballer for Partick Thistle, Motherwell, Newcastle United, also known as Tom Stewart
George Stewart (footballer, born 1882) (1882–1966), Australian rules footballer for Carlton
George Stewart (footballer, born 1901) (1901–1994), Australian rules footballer for South Melbourne
George Stewart (footballer, born 1883) (1882–1962), Scottish footballer for Hibernian, Manchester City, Scotland
George Stewart (footballer, born 1920), Scottish footballer
George Stewart (footballer, born 1927) (1927–2011), Scottish footballer
George Stewart (footballer, born 1932) (1932–1998), Scottish footballer
George Stewart (footballer, born 1947), Scottish footballer
George Stewart (American football), American football coach

See also
George Stuart (disambiguation)
George Steuart (disambiguation)